Al Krux (born in North Carolina) is an American professional poker player now based near Syracuse, New York.

Before turning to poker, Krux was a diamond merchant. He also once consulted with Native Americans about casinos and poker rooms. Krux is married with four children.

Career 
Krux has made the final table of the World Series of Poker (WSOP) $10,000 no limit hold'em main event on three occasions (6th in 1990, 5th in 1994 and 6th in 2004 where he was eliminated by eventual winner Greg "Fossilman" Raymer.)

Krux also won a WSOP bracelet in the 1996 $1,500 pot limit hold'em, defeating a final table that included "Miami" John Cernuto.

As of 2010, his total live tournament winnings exceed $1,400,000. His 12 cashes at the WSOP account for $1,178,820 of those winnings.

The casino where he mostly plays poker is Turning Stone Casino, which is located in Verona, New York, when he is not participating on the tournament circuit.

Controversy 
Krux, was charged with first-degree criminal possession of marijuana, along with his son Adam Krux, 32, who was also stopped in his vehicle with 15 pounds of pot inside. A subsequent search of their residences near Syracuse, New York, unearthed a further 90 marijuana plants and $5,000 in cash.

Notes

External links
Interview
Hendon Mob tournament results

American poker players
American people of Italian descent
Living people
World Series of Poker bracelet winners
People from North Carolina
People from Fayetteville, New York
Year of birth missing (living people)